George Harris Hodgson (4 May 1839 – 15 April 1917) was an English first-class cricketer.

The son of John George Hodgson, he was born at Thanet in May 1839. He was educated at Harrow School, before going up to Trinity College, Oxford. A keen cricketer, Hodgson did not feature in first-class cricket for Oxford University Cricket Club, but did make four first-class appearances for the Gentlemen of Kent from 1858–61. He scored 74 runs in his four matches at an average of 18.50, with a high score of 32. With his roundarm fast bowling he took 2 wickets.

Hodgson graduated from Oxford in 1866 with a master's degree. He later served as secretary to the Clergy Mutual Assurance Society. Hodgson died at Hythe in April 1917.

References

External links

1839 births
1917 deaths
People from Thanet (district)
People educated at Harrow School
Alumni of Trinity College, Oxford
English cricketers
Gentlemen of Kent cricketers
People from Hythe, Kent